Euodynerus dantici is a species of potter wasps in the family Vespidae. This widespread species is present in most of Europe, in the East Palearctic ecozone, in the Near East, in the Neotropical Region, in North Africa and in the Oriental Region.

References

Potter wasps
Hymenoptera of Africa
Hymenoptera of Asia
Hymenoptera of Europe
Insects described in 1790
Taxa named by Pietro Rossi